Virgil Delphini Parris (February 18, 1807 – June 13, 1874) was a U.S. Representative from Maine, and cousin of Albion Keith Parris.

Born in Buckfield, Massachusetts (now in Maine), Parris attended the common schools, whereupon he entered Hebron Academy in Hebron, then Colby College in Waterville. He was graduated from Union College at Schenectady, New York in 1827. He studied law. Parris was admitted to the bar in 1830 and commenced practice in Buckfield, Maine. He served as assistant secretary of the Maine Senate in 1831, and as a member of the state House of Representatives between 1832-1837.

Parris was elected as a Democrat to the Twenty-fifth Congress to fill the vacancy caused by the death of Timothy J. Carter. He was reelected to the Twenty-sixth Congress and served from May 29, 1838, to March 3, 1841, but was an unsuccessful candidate for renomination in 1840. He then served as a member of the State Senate in 1842 and 1843, part of the time serving as president pro tempore and as acting governor of the state. From 1844-1848, Parris served as United States marshal for the district of Maine, then as special mail agent for New England in 1853. He was appointed naval storekeeper at the Portsmouth Naval Shipyard in 1856. He served as delegate to the Democratic National Conventions in 1852 and 1872.

Parris died in Paris, Maine, June 13, 1874. He was interred in the Rawson family knoll in the Old Cemetery.

References

1807 births
1874 deaths
People from Buckfield, Maine
Colby College alumni
Union College (New York) alumni
Presidents of the Maine Senate
United States Marshals
Democratic Party members of the United States House of Representatives from Maine
19th-century American politicians
People from Paris, Maine